Toporivtsi is a village in Chernivtsi Raion, Chernivtsi Oblast, Ukraine. It hosts the administration of Toporivtsi rural hromada, one of the hromadas of Ukraine.

Until 18 July 2020, Toporivtsi belonged to Novoselytsia Raion. The raion was abolished in July 2020 as part of the administrative reform of Ukraine, which reduced the number of raions of Chernivtsi Oblast to three. The area of Novoselytsia Raion was split between Chernivtsi and Dnistrovskyi Raions, with Toporivtsi being transferred to Chernivtsi Raion. Toporivtsi rural hromada also included the villages of Hrozyntsi, Kolinkivtsi, and Bochkivtsi, which belonged to Khotyn Raion. After the reform, these villages were transferred to Chernivtsi Raion.

References

Villages in Chernivtsi Raion
Bessarabia Governorate